London and Coimbra Portugal based art duo Sardine & Tobleroni work together in mixed media on canvas, dividing the surface into two halves of which the right hand side is painted by Sardine and the left hand side by Tobleroni. The duo describes their practice as Conceptual Art Brut, the equivalent to what punk is in music.

Biography
Sardine & Tobleroni have been working together since 2006. Tobleroni was born in Switzerland in 1971. He studied art in Japan and Basel and exhibited internationally as Jay Rechsteiner until 2006. Sardine was born in Portugal in 1972 and is involved in the music industry, having toured internationally as Victor ‘Torpedo' Silveira, with his bands 77, Tédio Boys, Blood Safari and Parkinsons, featured in their "We Love 77" series.

Their first joint solo show opened in Lisbon, Portugal on 1 March 2008 titled "Espelho Meu" (English: My Mirror), which incorporated 39 paintings of Portuguese Rock and Punk bands from the 1950s until now. The exhibition has been going on tour from July 2008 throughout Portugal.

In 2009 they received significant press attention for their participation in four exhibitions organised by WW Gallery curators Debra Wilson and Chiara Williams: "PG:Parental Guidance", "Summer Exhibitionists", "Both Ends Burning" and "Travelling Light", a collateral event at the 53rd Venice Biennale supported by the British Council that launched them onto the international art stage.

Sardine & Tobleroni's first major solo exhibition, "We Love 77" was the culmination of over a year's work. It featured 77 paintings of the most iconic Punk and Rock bands such as The Clash, Sex Pistols, Ramones, Buzzcocks, MC5, The Stooges, Patti Smith, New York Dolls and Siouxsie and the Banshees. The title of the exhibition was associated with 1977 but also features influential bands from before and after this date. The show was presented and curated by Wilson and Williams at WW Gallery offsite venue, The Merchant's Hall, from February 19 through March 21, 2010.

References

External links

Art duos
British artists
Contemporary painters
People from Hackney Central
Artists from Basel-Stadt
People from Coimbra
Swiss contemporary artists
Portuguese artists